James Rillay Kerray (2 December 1935 – 6 November 2021) was a Scottish professional footballer who played during the 1950s and 1960s for clubs in England and Scotland.

References

External links

1935 births
2021 deaths
Footballers from Stirling
Scottish footballers
Association football midfielders
Raith Rovers F.C. players
Dunfermline Athletic F.C. players
Huddersfield Town A.F.C. players
Newcastle United F.C. players
St Johnstone F.C. players
Stirling Albion F.C. players
Falkirk F.C. players
English Football League players
Scottish Football League players